KVRP (1400 AM) is a commercial radio station located in Stamford, Texas, broadcasting to the northern sections of the Abilene, Texas, area.  KVRP airs a Christian contemporary music format branded as "The River".  The programming is syndicated by Salem Radio Network.

The station is an affiliate of the Dallas Cowboys radio network.

References

External links

VRP
Contemporary Christian radio stations in the United States
Radio stations established in 1947
1947 establishments in Texas
VRP